South Nottinghamshire, formally the "Southern Division of Nottinghamshire" was a county constituency represented in the House of Commons of the Parliament of the United Kingdom. It elected two Members of Parliament (MPs) by the bloc vote system of election.

Boundaries
1832–1885: The Hundreds of Rushcliffe, Bingham, Newark and Thurgarton.

History
The constituency was created by the Reform Act 1832 for the 1832 general election, when the two-seat Nottinghamshire constituency was replaced by the Northern and Southern divisions, each of which elected two MPs.

Both divisions were abolished by the Redistribution of Seats Act 1885 for the  1885 general election, when they were replaced by four new single-seat constituencies: Bassetlaw, Mansfield, Newark and Rushcliffe.

Members of Parliament

Election results

Elections in the 1830s

Elections in the 1840s

Pelham-Clinton was appointed Commissioners of Woods, Forests, Land Revenues, Works and Buildings, requiring a by-election.

Pelham-Clinton was appointed Chief Secretary to the Lord Lieutenant of Ireland, requiring a by-election.

Rolleston resigned by accepting the office of Steward of the Chiltern Hundreds, causing a by-election.

Elections in the 1850s
Bromley's death caused a by-election.

Elections in the 1860s
Pierrepont succeeded to the peerage, becoming Earl Manvers and causing a by-election.

Stanhope succeeded to the peerage, becoming 7th Earl of Chesterfield and causing a by-election.

Elections in the 1870s

Elections in the 1880s

References 

Parliamentary constituencies in Nottinghamshire (historic)
Constituencies of the Parliament of the United Kingdom established in 1832
Constituencies of the Parliament of the United Kingdom disestablished in 1885